Ernie Gates (March 3, 1909 – September 23, 1973) was a Canadian cyclist. He competed in the individual and team road race events at the 1932 Summer Olympics.

References

External links
 

1909 births
1973 deaths
Sportspeople from Brighton
Canadian male cyclists
English emigrants to Canada
Olympic cyclists of Canada
Cyclists at the 1932 Summer Olympics